The Norwegian Institute of International Affairs (NUPI) is a Norwegian research institution based in Oslo, Norway. It was established by the Norwegian Parliament in 1959.

History
The Norwegian Institute of International Affairs (NUPI) was established by the Norwegian Parliament in 1959 in order to promote a better understanding of international issues in Norway. NUPI has sought to achieve this by undertaking a wide range of research activities and by disseminating information on international issues. Among the Norwegian institutes that do international affairs research, NUPI has a leading position on matters of direct relevance to Norwegian foreign policy and economic relations.

Although it was previously entirely funded over the state budget (later supplemented by a sizable share of outside project funding), NUPI's independence from Norwegian foreign policy is secured by its subordination to the Ministry of Education rather than the Ministry of Foreign Affairs (distinguishing it from its counterparts in Sweden and many other countries). The institute as such has never taken a policy stance on current issues, but has left this to the professional judgment of its individual researchers. Nevertheless, in the Norwegian political debate and in the wider Norwegian research community of international affairs, NUPI has tended to be perceived as close to the government's views, whether the government has been Labour or Conservative, center-left or center-right. Several of its directors have been prominent Labour politicians, notably John Sanness, Johan Jørgen Holst and Jan Egeland. Three of its other researchers, Anders C. Sjaastad, John Kristen Skogan and Janne Haaland Matlary, have been members of Conservative / center-right or centrist governments.

Organisation
Ulf Sverdrup has served as director since 2012. The institute employs research professors (corresponding to full professors), senior researchers (corresponding to associate professors), researchers (corresponding to assistant professors), and non-academic staff.

The institute is organised into five research groups (January 2022): 
 Research group for Security and defence 
 Research group for Russia, Asia and International Trade 
 Research group for Peace, Conflict and Development 
 Research group for Global Order and Diplomacy 
 Research group on Climate and Energy

Directors
The position was originally a permanent appointment. In 1996 it was changed to a once-renewable 6-year appointment.

John Sanness 1959-83
Johan Jørgen Holst 1983–1986 and 1989–1990
Kjell Skjelsbæk 1986–1989
Olav Fagelund Knudsen 1990–1995
Olav Stokke 1996
Sverre Lodgaard 1997–2007
Jan Egeland 2007–2011
Ulf Sverdrup 2012–

References

External links

1959 establishments in Norway
Government agencies established in 1959
Government agencies of Norway
Research institutes established in 1959